Label No Genre is an Atlanta, Georgia-based independent record label, founded in 2014, by American recording artist and music producer B.o.B.

History
In September 2013, B.o.B revealed he had plans to launch his own record label imprint. During an interview, he stated "I'm putting my CEO pants on, man. I'm finna start a label called HamSquad and I'm looking for artists to be the flagship artists for the label. So I'm really excited about that." Before 'HamSquad Records', HamSquad originally referred to the production/rap collective of B.o.B, Playboy Tre, DJ Swatts, DJ Smooth, Moss B, B-Rich and TJ Chapman.

In 2014, B.o.B started searching the internet for independent artists, he was originally believed to be scouting talent for his mixtape No Genre Pt. 2. He would start posting pictures on Instagram of a logo which contained the words "Label No Genre" getting the word out that he was starting his own label. On June 9, 2014, in an interview with Bootleg Kev, B.o.B announced his new record label imprint would be called Label No Genre, named after his 2010 mixtape. The only member of the roster to actually land a spot on the No Genre Pt. 2 mixtape was Jake Lambo. B.o.B would keep the label's roster under wraps until it was unveiled on the 2015 compilation mixtape, No Genre: The Label.

Artists

Current acts

Releases

References

Record labels established in 2014
American independent record labels
Hip hop record labels
Vanity record labels